Emperor of the French (French: Empereur des Français) was the title of the monarch and supreme ruler of the First and the Second French Empires.

Details 

A title and office used by the House of Bonaparte starting when Napoleon was proclaimed Emperor on 18 May 1804 by the Senate and was crowned Emperor of the French on 2 December 1804 at the cathedral of Notre-Dame de Paris, in Paris, with the Crown of Napoleon.

The title emphasized that the emperor ruled over "the French people" (the nation) and not over France (the state). The old formula of "King of France" indicated that the king owned France as a personal possession. The new term indicated a constitutional monarchy. The title was purposely created to preserve the appearance of the French Republic and to show that after the French Revolution, the feudal system was abandoned and a nation-state was created, with equal citizens as the subjects of their emperor. (After 1 January 1809, the state was officially referred to as the French Empire.)

The title of "Emperor of the French" was supposed to demonstrate that Napoleon's coronation was not a restoration of the monarchy, but an introduction of a new political system: the French Empire. Napoleon's reign lasted until 22 June 1815, when he was defeated at the Battle of Waterloo, exiled and imprisoned on the island of Saint Helena, where he died on 5 May 1821. His reign was interrupted by the Bourbon Restoration of 1814 and his exile to Elba, from where he escaped less than a year later to reclaim the throne, reigning as Emperor for another 111 days before his final defeat and exile.

Less than a year after the 1851 French coup d'état by Napoleon's nephew Louis-Napoléon Bonaparte, which ended in the successful dissolution of the French National Assembly, the Second French Republic was transformed into the Second French Empire, established by a referendum on 7 November 1852. President Louis-Napoléon Bonaparte, elected by the French people, officially became Napoleon III, Emperor of the French, from the symbolic and historic date of 2 December 1852. His reign continued until 4 September 1870, after he was captured at the Battle of Sedan during the Franco-Prussian War. He subsequently went into exile in the United Kingdom, where he died on 9 January 1873.

Since the death of Napoleon III's only son, Louis Napoléon in 1879, the House of Bonaparte has had a number of claimants to the French throne. The current claimant is Charles, Prince Napoléon, who became head of the House of Bonaparte on 3 May 1997. His position is challenged by his son, Jean-Christophe, Prince Napoléon, who was named as heir in his late grandfather's testament.

Full styles 
The Emperors of the French had various titles and claims that reflected the geographic expanse and diversity of the lands ruled by the House of Bonaparte.

Napoleon I 
His Imperial and Royal Majesty Napoleon I, By the Grace of God and the Constitution of the Republic, Emperor of the French, King of Italy, Protector of the Confederation of the Rhine, Mediator of the Swiss Confederation and Co-Prince of Andorra.

Among the honors he instituted or received were:

 : Grand Master of the Legion of Honour
 : Grand Master of the Order of the Reunion
  Kingdom of Italy: Grand Master of the Order of the Iron Crown
 : Grand Cross of the Order of St. Stephen, 1810
 : Knight of the Order of St. Hubert, 1805
 : Knight of the Order of the Elephant, 18 May 1808
  Kingdom of Portugal: Grand Cross of the Sash of the Three Orders, 8 May 1805
  Kingdom of Prussia: Knight of the Order of the Black Eagle, 1805
 : Knight of the Order of St. Andrew, July 1807
  Kingdom of Spain: Knight of the Order of the Golden Fleece, 1805
  Kingdom of Sweden: Knight of the Order of the Seraphim, 3 February 1811

Napoleon II 
His Imperial Majesty Napoleon II, By the Grace of God and the Constitution of the Republic, Emperor of the French and Co-Prince of Andorra.

Napoleon III 
His Imperial Majesty Napoleon III, By the Grace of God and the will of the Nation, Emperor of the French and Co-Prince of Andorra.

List of emperors

First French Empire

Hundred Days 
Regarded as a continuation of the First French Empire despite the brief exile of the Emperor Napoleon I

Second French Empire

See also 
 Crown of Napoleon
 French Crown Jewels
 List of French consorts
 List of French monarchs

References 

Emperor
French titles of nobility